The Lamborghini Terzo Millennio (Italian for Third Millennium) is a futuristic electric concept car introduced by Italian automobile manufacturer Lamborghini and developed in collaboration with the Massachusetts Institute of Technology (MIT). It is the first product of a three-year, £100,000,000 partnership among the two institutions. The Terzo Millennio was unveiled in November 2017 at the EmTech conference in Cambridge, Massachusetts, United States.

Overview 

The design of the Terzo Millennio is considered part of the "Gandini Line" and is the work of Lamborghini chief designer Mitja Borkert and the company's Centro Stile department. The vehicle's technology was developed by Lamborghini's professional engineers and  MIT's professors and students, and was unveiled at the EmTech conference in Cambridge, Massachusetts, United States. Lamborghini's chief technical officer, Maurizio Reggiani stated that the car is more of a "thinking box" than an actual production car. He also stresses that the car doesn't confirm that the company will not be directly going with vehicles powered by electricity.

The Terzo Millennio was also used as a representative for the sports cars of the future.

Vehicle information

Electric motor 
The Terzo Millennio uses high-capacity supercapacitors in lieu of batteries, due to their more rapid storage and discharge of energy. These supercapacitors have been made to simultaneously capture and release energy to give the car an increase in performance, without having to depend on chemical reactions. Each wheel, the rims of which glow orange, contains an electric motor, so that the amount of torque can be controlled individually, making the car's stability as good as a modern Formula One car. Because there is a motor on every wheel, the car's layout would be all-wheel drive if it was functional.

Autonomous capabilities 
The Terzo Millennio is reported to have an autonomous system, but only for racetrack driving. This system would make the car run a full lap without any mistakes, then teach the driver how to run the lap on their own, using a ghost car, which is based on video game series such as Forza, and Gran Turismo.

Design and body 

The car still inherits the modern Lamborghini design, with the Y-shaped design elements such as the headlights and taillights, along with the triangular front trunk and rear engine bay.

Carbon fibre is used entirely for the body panels. The body of the car is monitored by a health system. Entry by passengers is via a sliding canopy.

See also 
 Museo Lamborghini
 List of Lamborghini concept vehicles

References 

Terzo Millennio
2010s cars
One-off cars
Sports cars
Electric concept cars